The 2008 Miami FC season was the third season of the team in the USL First Division.
This year, the team finished in ninth place for the regular season.  They did not make the playoffs.

USL First Division Regular season

Standings

First Division

Tie-breaker order: 1. Head-to-head points; 2. Total wins; 3. Goal difference; 4. Goals for; 5. Lottery
† Rochester deducted 1 point for use of an ineligible player on August 10, 2008

References

External links

2008
Fort Lauderdale Strikers
Miami FC